{{Speciesbox
|image=Limonium minutum 2017-09-26 4897.jpg
|image_caption=In bloom
|image2=Limonium minutum 2017-09-26 4898.jpg
|image2_caption=Close up of rosettes
|genus=Limonium
|species=minutum
|authority=(L.) Chaz.
|synonyms_ref=
|synonyms=
Statice minuta 
Statice minuta var. balearica MartelliStatice virgata var. minuta Taxanthema minutum 
}}Limonium minutum'', the dwarf statice, is a species of flowering plant in the family Plumbaginaceae, native to the Balearic Islands. A halophyte found in coastal habitats, it is occasionally available from commercial suppliers.

References

minutum
Halophytes
Endemic flora of Spain
Flora of the Balearic Islands
Plants described in 1790